Far Caravan is a historical novel by Australian author E. V. Timms, an adventure story set in 17th-century Russia.

References

External links
Serialised copy of novel –  6 May

1935 Australian novels
Australian historical novels
Australian adventure novels
Novels set in Russia
Novels set in the 17th century
Angus & Robertson books